The following low-power television stations broadcast on digital or analog channel 38 in the United States:

 K38IM in Albuquerque, New Mexico, to move to channel 34
 K38JX-D in Grand Junction, Colorado, to move to channel 14
 K38MM-D in International Falls, Minnesota, to move to channel 35

The following stations, which are no longer licensed, formerly broadcast on digital or analog channel 38:
 K38BU-D in Gruver, Texas
 K38EL in Fairbanks, Alaska
 K38FO-D in Carbondale, Colorado
 K38GP in Green River, Utah
 K38HU in Kailua-Kona, Hawaii
 K38HV in Samak, Utah
 K38IO in De Leon, Texas
 K38IT in Stemilt, etc., Washington
 K38JD in Durango, Colorado
 K38KZ-D in Bovina, etc., Texas
 K38LK-D in Jacks Cabin, Colorado
 K38OF-D in Crowley, Louisiana
 K38OR-D in Jonesboro, Arkansas
 KCJY-LP in Twin Falls, Idaho
 KHOH-LP in Hilo, Hawaii
 KJCP-LP in Pago Pago, American Samoa
 KNDX-LD in Dickinson, North Dakota
 KPAL-LP in Palmdale, California
 KVFW-LD in Fort Worth, Texas
 KVSW-LP in Winslow, Arizona
 KXND-LD in Williston, North Dakota
 KZMD-LD in Lufkin, Texas
 W38BN in Salisbury, Maryland
 W38CB in Littleton, New Hampshire
 W38EM-D in Albany, Georgia
 W38FI-D in Laurel, Mississippi
 WALM-LD in Sebring, Florida
 WBMG-LD in Moody, Alabama
 WGCW-LP in Savannah, Georgia
 WHCT-LP in Hartford, Connecticut

References

38 low-power